is a Japanese politician who served as the Minister of Loneliness from 12 February 2021 to 4 October 2021. He is also a member of the House of Representatives in the Diet (national legislature), representing the Liberal Democratic Party (Japan).

Career
A native of Ōzu, Kumamoto and graduate of Chuo University, he had served in the assembly of Kumamoto Prefecture for four terms since 1991. He was elected to the House of Representatives for the first time in 2003.

His profile on the LDP website:
Member, Kumamoto Prefectural Assembly
Parliamentary Secretary for Internal Affairs and Communications (Fukuda and Aso Cabinet)
Deputy Chairman, Diet Affairs Committee of LDP
Acting Director, Public Management, Home Affairs, Posts and Telecommunications Division of LDP
Chairman, Committee on Organizations Involved with Agriculture, Forestry and Fisheries of LDP
Senior Vice Minister of Internal Affairs and Communications / Senior Vice Minister of Cabinet Office

Sakamoto is affiliated to the openly revisionist lobby Nippon Kaigi, a member of the related group at the Diet, as well as of the group related to Shintō Seiji Renmei at the Diet.

Minister of Loneliness
On 12 February 2021, Prime Minister Yoshihide Suga created a cabinet post to alleviate social isolation. Sakamoto was appointed to fill the post.

References

External links 
  in Japanese.

1950 births
Living people
People from Kumamoto Prefecture
Chuo University alumni
Members of Nippon Kaigi
Members of the House of Representatives (Japan)
Liberal Democratic Party (Japan) politicians
21st-century Japanese politicians